Lee Wing Yan (born 28 April 1997) is a Hongkonger footballer who plays as a midfielder for Hong Kong Women League club Happy Valley AA and the Hong Kong women's national team.

International career
Lee Wing Yan represented Hong Kong at the 2013 AFC U-16 Women's Championship qualification, two AFC U-19 Women's Championship qualification editions (2013 and 2015), the 2017 EAFF E-1 Football Championship, the 2018 AFC Women's Asian Cup qualification, the 2018 Asian Games and the 2020 AFC Women's Olympic Qualifying Tournament.

International goals

See also
List of Hong Kong women's international footballers

References

1997 births
Living people
Hong Kong women's footballers
Women's association football midfielders
Hong Kong women's international footballers